Lair Hill Park is a  public park in southwest Portland, Oregon. The space was acquired in 1927. It features a 1978 sculpture by Bruce West called BW1.

References

External links

 

1927 establishments in Oregon
Parks in Portland, Oregon
Southwest Portland, Oregon